Ashippun is an unincorporated census-designated place located in the town of Ashippun, Dodge County, Wisconsin, United States. Ashippun has a post office with ZIP code 53003. At the 2020 census, its population was 1,166, more than triple the population of 333 in 2010.

Demographics

References

Census-designated places in Dodge County, Wisconsin
Census-designated places in Wisconsin